Valerie Wright-St Clair is a New Zealand registered occupational therapist and Professor of Social Gerontology and Occupational Science in the School of Health Sciences at Auckland University of Technology (AUT).

Academic career 
Wright-St Clair's mother was a nurse and father a general practitioner. She completed her secondary education in Hamilton. She qualified as an occupational therapist in 1984, then practised in New Zealand hospitals and at Royal Edinburgh Hospital in Scotland.

Her career in academia began in October 1990 when she was appointed lecturer at Auckland University of Technology. In November 2018 Wright-St Clair was appointed full professor at AUT with effect from 1 January 2019.

She is co-director of the AUT Centre for Active Ageing and joint head of research in the Occupational Science and Therapy department at AUT.

Selected works

Books

Articles

References

External links 

 
 
 

Living people
Year of birth missing (living people)
Academic staff of the Auckland University of Technology
New Zealand women academics
Occupational therapists